The Schimbrig is a mountain of the Emmental Alps, located in the municipality of Hasle in the canton of Lucerne.

In the nineteenth century a tourist resort was established at the foot of the mountain where a natural sulphur spring surfaces. The resort Schimbrig Bad was successful until it burnt down in a fire in the early twentieth century.

References

External links
Schimbrig on Hikr

Mountains of the Alps
Mountains of Switzerland
Mountains of the canton of Lucerne
Emmental Alps
One-thousanders of Switzerland